The Athletics at the 2016 Summer Paralympics – Women's 1500 metres T11 event at the 2016 Paralympic Games took place on 17 September 2016, at the Estádio Olímpico João Havelange.

Heats

Heat 1 
12:43 15 September 2016:

Heat 2 
12:51 15 September 2016:

Final 
17:38 17 September 2016:

Notes

Athletics at the 2016 Summer Paralympics